Radisson Blu Hotel Olümpia is hotel in Kesklinn, Tallinn at Liivalaia Street 33. The hotel was built in 1980 for the 1980 Summer Olympic Games. It has a height of 84 m.

The hotel was designed by architects Ain Andressoo, Toivo Kallas and Rein Kersten.

The hotel has 26 floors and 390 visitor rooms.

References

External links

Hotels in Tallinn